Chaetogastra longifolia is a species of flowering plant in the family Melastomataceae, native to Mexico through the Caribbean to northern South America. It has many synonyms, including Tibouchina longifolia. It was first described in 1797 by Martin Vahl as Rhexia longifolia.

References

longifolia
Flora of Mexico
Flora of the Caribbean
Flora of northern South America
Flora of western South America
Plants described in 1797
Flora without expected TNC conservation status